Rohese de Vere, Countess of Essex (c. 1110 – 1170 or after) was a noblewoman in England in the Anglo-Norman and Angevin periods. Married twice, she and her second husband founded the Gilbertine monastery of Chicksands in Bedfordshire.

Life 
A daughter of Aubrey de Vere II and Adeliza de Clare, Rohese married twice. Her first husband, Geoffrey de Mandeville II, became Earl of Essex in 1140 and Rohese thereafter was styled countess.  Earl Geoffrey rebelled against King Stephen late in 1143. Rohese's whereabouts during his rebellion are unknown; their eldest son seems to have been sent to Devizes, a stronghold of the supporters of the Empress Matilda, while their second son may have been sent to the court of the count of Flanders. When Earl Geoffrey died an excommunicate rebel in 1144, his widow remarried swiftly. 

Her second husband, Payn de Beauchamp, lord of Bedford, had opposed King Stephen in the 1130s. The couple founded a double monastery at Chicksands, Bedfordshire, for nuns and canons of the Gilbertine Order. They had one son, Simon de Beauchamp II. Countess Rohese was widowed a second time in 1155 or early 1156 and gained the guardianship of her minor son. When he was near his majority, Countess Rohese and Simon converted St. Paul's, Bedford, from a house of canons secular to one of regular canons and moved them to Newnham, Bedfordshire.

According to the Walden Chronicle, when the countess's eldest son, Geoffrey de Mandeville III, earl of Essex, died in 1166, his men decided to take his body for burial at Walden Priory in Essex, founded by his father.  Countess Rohese was at Chicksands Priory when a member of the entourage escorting the earl's body arrived to inform her of her son's death. He suggested that she send knights to seize the earl's body for burial at Chicksands. The countess rejected that suggestion, but when she later attended her son's funeral at Walden, she seized altar goods and other objects that her son had donated to Walden and gave them instead to Chicksands.

The countess almost certainly spent the remainder of her life at Chicksands Priory. She witnessed a charter of her son Earl William in 1170, the last evidence of her life which can be dated, and when she died she was buried in the Chicksands chapter house and honored as the priory's foundress.  

Rohese, countess of Essex, is sometimes confused with another, contemporary 'Countess Rohese,' who was the wife of Gilbert de Gant, Earl of Lincoln.  The two women were first cousins through their mothers.

Children
 Geoffrey III, 2nd Earl of Essex (d. October 1166)
 William de Mandeville, 3rd Earl of Essex (d. 1189)
 Robert de Mandeville (d. before 1189)
 Simon de Beauchamp, lord of Bedford (d. 1206)

While Earl Geoffrey's eldest son Ernulf de Mandeville is sometimes listed as the child of Countess Rohese, there is strong evidence that Ernulf was the earl's illegitimate son, born before Geoffrey's marriage to Rohese.

Sources 
 Complete Peerage of England, Scotland, Ireland, Great Britain and the United Kingdom by G. E. Cokayne, vol. X:Appendix J:116

References 

Essex, Vere, Rohese de
1110s births
12th-century deaths
12th-century English people
Countess, de Vere
Rohese
12th-century English women